David Andrew Farrow (born January 10, 1975) is a two-time Canadian Guinness World Record Holder for Most Decks of Playing Cards Memorized in a Single Sighting, entrepreneur, memory coach, speed reader and keynote speaker. He is best known for winning the Guinness World Records for Most Decks of Playing Cards Memorized in a Single Sighting in 1996 and again in 2007 when he set out to reclaim his record after it was beaten in 2002. The initial record was set at the Guinness World Records museum in Niagara Falls, Ontario, Canada while the latter was performed for Discovery Channel Canada at CTV Television Network studios. Both records were accomplished under the controlled supervision of multiple cameras and multiple independent witnesses.

Early life

Dave Farrow was born on January 10, 1975, in Kitchener, Ontario, to Wayne and Virginia Farrow. Born into a blue-collar family, his father Wayne is a retired factory worker, who dealt in space shuttle parts and his mother Virginia is a homemaker. After resuscitating him twice during birth, doctors offered a bleak prognosis, suggesting Farrow was unlikely to survive past his first year due to the numerous health problems that would plague his infancy and childhood. He was constantly in and out of the hospital during his formative years, which affected his studies and severely impacted his learning.

Despite experiencing this setback, Farrow was able to catch up on schoolwork through independent study. Although he went beyond the curriculum coursework and completed the requirements for the following year, the school refused his request to skip a grade. Farrow eventually got bored and started skipping school. His truancy coupled with his medical issues started to play a toll on his academia and by middle school; he fell behind the learning curve. He was told by one of his teachers that would not amount to anything in life and that he would end up in the blue-collar industry like his father. In addition, Farrow was diagnosed with attention deficit hyperactivity disorder (ADHD) and dyslexia. The doctors recommended that he be put on a consistent course of Ritalin but his mother refused. Following this decision, Farrow decided to take matter into his own hands and began exploring behavior modification approaches to manage his disability. He started going to the library on a frequent basis to expand his knowledge and coming up with memory methods to combat his ADHD and dyslexia through self-taught speed reading and memorizing. This created the foundation of what was later to be known as The Farrow Method. At the age of 14, Farrow was enrolled into Eastwood Collegiate Institute, a public high school in Kitchener. It was there that he started improving his grades dramatically and graduated from high school with perfect distinction and continued on to become a successful businessman.

Farrow has an older sister, Kathy, who was born in September 1973. Growing up, he and his family would go to their family cottage at Biscotasi Lake Provincial Park in Biscotasing, Ontario, on a regular basis for family vacations. The family trips to the outdoors helped build his passion for wilderness survival and hiking.

Guinness World Records

At the age of 21, Farrow received his first Guinness World Record for Most Decks of Playing Cards Memorized in a Single Sighting in 1996 where he memorized the order of 52 decks of playing cards, randomly shuffled together, and recalled them correctly under Guinness Record rules (a total of 2704 cards) in a single sighting. This feat was accomplished at the Guinness World Records museum in Niagara Falls, Ontario and is featured in the Guinness Book of World Records, 1997 edition. Years later in 2002, Dominic O'Brien broke his record by memorizing 54 decks of cards. By this time, Farrow was able to easily break the record again in 2007.

He memorized on single sighting, a random sequence of 59 separate packs of cards (3,068 cards), which took around 14 hours to memorize.  Farrow later recalled these cards at CTV Studios, Daily Planet in Toronto, Ontario, Canada, on April 2, 2007, and the recall took approximately 9 hours. While undertaking this feat, Farrow made just one mistake during the entire attempt, which he corrected without any external assistance. This successful record is currently featured in the Guinness Book of World Records, 2009 edition, and remains unbroken to this day. What makes this record challenging is that participants can only see each card once with zero repetition and they are only allowed 0.5% errors while many other records allow a much high error rate. Therefore, this record is currently considered the most difficult memory feat for volume and accuracy of memory.

Sony Reader Revolution
In October 2008, Sony Corporation invited Farrow to participate in a publicity campaign for their just announced PRS-700 Sony Reader. As part of their Reader Revolution campaign, Farrow lived in the DataVision store window on Fifth Avenue, New York City for 30 days. The Reader Revolution campaign was an effort to promote the newest version of the Sony Reader and to increase the engagement of the general public in digital reading. Sony promised that for each page Farrow read, Sony would give a set of 100 E-book classics to an education institution. The goal was to eventually give 15 million E-book titles to various schools by the end of the program. During the campaign, Farrow read a total of 44,097 pages, which translates to 102 books.

Career
After gaining international attention for his 1996 Guinness World Record accomplishment, Farrow continued to utilize his own memory techniques and skills to educate himself in the field of nanotechnology. His passion in nanotechnology led him to speaking at conferences across North America, in front of the research division of Johnson & Johnson and to members of the White House Task Force, as well as being featured in a nanotechnology trade magazine. Building on this success, Farrow founded the nanotechnology company, Accella Scientific Inc. In 2003 where he was involved in a U.S. patent filing for a reliable hand-held HIV diagnostics device that he hopes to bring to market and change the way HIV is tested in developing countries. In 2010, Farrow founded Farrow Inc., which  has subsidiaries Farrow Memory, FarrowPR  and Farrowbot.

FarrowPR, a public relations firm based in Buffalo, New York, was founded in 2012 and offers speaker services, sales training, media coaching, corporate and individual branding, social media and digital marketing, media and public relations services, and event management.

Dave developed the Farrow Memory System to learn and memorize things faster. The Farrow Memory is a unique memory course that consists of ancient and neuroscientific memory techniques that help people retain memory for a long time. The Farrow Method is proven to be 3x more effective than other learning methods in a double-blind neuroscience study at McGill University, Montreal, Canada.

The training is available for people of all ages, from kids, students to professionals. The course even helps people with ADHD and dyslexia improve their learning and memory.

Farrow Memory Kids Edition: This edition is geared toward young children under 5–10 years of age. The Kid's edition is created with an aim to help foster proper memory training methods from a young age. The course includes all the essential learning that allows kids to absorb information from their surroundings and retain it in their long-term memory. You can find more information at  Farrow Memory Kids Edition.

Farrow Memory Students Edition is a part of the Farrow Memory training developed specifically for school and university students. In this course, Dave aims to help students grasp concepts learned in the classroom and retain them in the long term. Students will find unique memory techniques in this edition that will help them ace their exams. In addition to this, there are also techniques for students that experience brain fog while taking the exam. You can find more information at Farrow Memory Student's Edition.

Farrow Memory Professional Edition: This edition is developed with the aim to help professionals improve memory. Professionals cannot afford errors in their work. But, when you have difficulties remembering, even simple tasks seem herculean. Farrow Memory Professionals Edition introduces memory techniques and brain exercises to prevent cognitive decline. It also helps to advance your career by learning what is needed in a fraction of the time. You can find more information at Farrow Memory Professional Edition.

World Memory Tournament Federation

The World Memory Tournament Federation (WMTF) is an educational initiative cofounded by Dave Farrow and Sergio Gonzalez. It aims to improve the memory of students and to "democratize practical memory and empower lifelong learning" by encouraging the establishments of World Memory Tournament Clubs in schools across the globe as an extracurricular club with materials provided by the WMTF. The World Memory Tournament Federation also provides an online platform for members belonging to clubs located in various regions to come together and compete in memory tournaments set by the MTF. The WMTF has 30 clubs in 7 countries and are currently organizing national competitions in Canada, the United States and South Africa.

Personal life

Farrow first met his wife, Andrea Lee Zakel at Toronto's Polaris Star Trek convention in 2004.  They were legally married in 2008 at Toronto City Hall and had their wedding at Backus Mill Heritage and Conservation Centre. They currently live in Buffalo, New York and have one son, Alexander, born in April 2014.

References
 Archive.org 2009 Kitchener Record article

Living people
Mnemonists
World record holders
1975 births
People from Kitchener, Ontario